Singaporean may refer to:

related to Singapore
Demographics of Singapore
Culture of Singapore
Singaporean cuisine